Kaleh (also Romanized as Kāleh; also known as Gāneh) is a village in Bahnemir Rural District, Bahnemir District, Babolsar County, Mazandaran Province, Iran. At the 2006 census, its population was 1,600, in 426 families.

References 

Populated places in Babolsar County